The Vice State President of the South African Republic was the second highest political position in South African Republic.

The vice president was constitutional successor of the State President of the South African Republic.

The position was first established in March 1877 before the British annexation in April 1877.

List

References 

South African Republic politicians
Political office-holders in South Africa
South African Republic